New Haven is one of the areas of Enugu State that was mapped out in the 1960s and grown from a residential suburb to a major commercial area especially along Chime Avenue, the main high street. Enugu also has some of the richest igbo men in Nigerian history.

References

Enugu